Leonardo Flores (born 17 May 1997) is an Argentine professional footballer who plays as a defender for Almirante Brown, on loan from Banfield.

Career
Flores began with Lanús. February 2018 saw the defender move into Ezequiel Carboni's first-team squad, subsequently making his professional debut on 24 February in a 1–1 draw at home to Rosario Central. One more appearance arrived on 11 March against Estudiantes, in a season (2017–18) which the club ended in 22nd. On 15 July 2018, Brown of Primera B Nacional completed the loan signing of Flores. From June 2019 to June 2021, he was on loan at Atlanta.

On 30 July 2021, Flores joined Banfield on a deal until the end of 2024. To get some more playing time, Flores was loaned out to Almirante Brown in January 2022 for the rest of the year, with a purchase option.

Career statistics
.

References

External links

1997 births
Living people
Footballers from Buenos Aires
Argentine footballers
Association football defenders
Argentine Primera División players
Club Atlético Lanús footballers
Club Atlético Brown footballers
Club Atlético Atlanta footballers
Club Atlético Banfield footballers
Club Almirante Brown footballers